The Aleocharinae are one of the largest subfamilies of rove beetles, containing over 12,000 species. Previously subject to large-scale debate whether the subfamily deserved the familial status, it is now considered one of the largest subfamilies of rove beetles.

Description 
The body is usually slender, often densely and finely punctured; the head is more or less round and the color may be light or dark brown, reddish-brown, or black, sometimes with contrasting colors of red, yellow, and black.

Anatomy
Because of the size of the subfamily, their anatomy is extremely variable. However, a few key features are shared by all rove beetles. All members have antennae with 10 or 11 segments. The antennal insertion is posterior to a line drawn between the anterior margins of the eyes or anterior to a line drawn between the anterior margins of the eyes. The tarsal segments vary from 2-2-2 to 4-5-5.

Distribution and habitat
Rove beetles belonging to this subfamily are distributed throughout the world in almost all terrestrial habitats. They are commonly predators in soil communities and leaf litter, frequently inquilines in ant and termite nests or associated with mushrooms and fungi.

Ecology
This subfamily is common on all terrestrial habitats. It is collected through several methods, including the use of UV light, emergence chambers, sifting, using Berlese organic material, and pitfall traps.

The biology of the subfamily is complex. Many species are highly specialized, thus are prone to extinction. Free-living, parasitic, herbivorous, carnivorous, fungivorous, flying, walking, running, swimming, social, and solitary forms are known, but their life histories are almost unknown at the species level.

Systematics
This subfamily is one of the largest rove beetle subfamilies, containing 52 tribes, over 1000 genera, and over 12000 described species (about 1385 known from North America). This subfamily is a taxonomically difficult groups of beetles.

Tribes and selected genera
Below is a list of all the tribes and some selected genera.

 Tribe Actocharini Bernhauer & Schubert, 1911
 Tribe Aenictoteratini Kistner, 1993
 Tribe Akatastopsisini Pace, 2000
 Tribe Aleocharini Fleming, 1821
 Aleochara Gravenhorst, 1802
 Tinotus Sharp, 1883
 Tribe Athetini Casey, 1910
 Acrotona Thomson, 1859
 Actophylla Bernhauer, 1908
 Alevonota Thomson, 1856
 Alianta Thomson, 1858
 Aloconota Thomson, 1858
 Amischa Thomson, 1858
 Anopleta Mulsant & Rey, 1874
 Atheta Thomson, 1858
 Brundinia Tottenham, 1949
 Cadaverota Yosii & Sawada, 1976
 Callicerus Gravenhorst, 1802
 Coprothassa Thomson, 1859
 Dacrila Mulsant & Rey, 1874
 Dadobia Thomson, 1856
 Dilacra Thomson, 1858
 Dinaraea Thomson, 1858
 Disopora Thomson, 1859
 Dochmonota Thomson, 1859
 Geostiba Thomson, 1858
 Halobrecta Thomson, 1858
 Hydrosmecta Thomson, 1858
 Leptostiba Pace, 1985
 Liogluta Thomson, 1858
 Lundbergia Muona, 1975
 Lyprocorrhe Thomson, 1859
 Nehemitropia Lohse, 1971
 Ousipalia Des Gozis, 1886
 Pachnida Mulsant & Rey, 1874
 Pachyatheta Munster, 1930
 Paranopleta Brundin, 1954
 Philhygra Mulsant & Rey, 1873
 Pycnota Mulsant & Rey, 1874
 Schistoglossa Kraatz, 1856
 Thamiaraea Thomson, 1858
 Tomoglossa Kraatz, 1856
 Trichiusa Casey, 1856
 Trichomicra Brundin, 1941
 Tribe Autaliini Thomson, 1859
 Autalia Samouelle, 1819
 Tribe Cordobanini Bernhauer, 1910
 Tribe Corotocini Fenyes, 1918
 Tribe Crematoxenini Mann 1921
 Beyeria
 Neobeyeria
 Tribe Cryptonotopseini Pace, 2003
 Tribe Deinopsini Sharp, 1883
 Deinopsis Matthews, 1838
 Tribe Diestotini Mulsant & Rey, 1871
 Tribe Diglottini Jacobson, 1909
 Diglotta Champion, 1887
 Paradiglotta Ashe & Ahn, 2005
 Tribe Diestotini Mulsant & Rey, 1871
 Tribe Digrammini Fauvel, 1900
 Digrammus Fauvel, 1900
 Tribe Dorylogastrini Wasmann 1916
 Berghoffia Kistner, 2003
 Dorylocratus
 Dorylogaster
 Tribe Dorylomimini Wasmann 1916
 Dorylocratus
 Dorylomimus
 Dorylonannus
 Jeanneliusa
 Tribe Drepanoxenini Kistner & Watson, 1972
 Tribe Ecitocharini
 Ecitodaemon
 Ecitomorpha
 Ecitophya
 Ecitoschneirla
 Ecitosymbia (=Ecitoxenides)
 Ecitoxenia
 Ecitoxenides
 Retteneciton
 Seeverseciton
 Tribe Ecitogastrini
 Ecitogaster
 Tribe Eusteniamorphini Bernhauer & Scheerpeltz, 1926
 Tribe Falagriini Mulsant & Rey, 1873
 Anaulacaspis Ganglbauer, 1895
 Borboropora Kraatz, 1862
 Cordalia Jacobs, 1925
 Falagria Samouelle, 1819
 Falagrioma Casey, 1906
 Flavipennis Cameron, 1920
 Myrmecocephalus MacLeay, 1871
 Myrmecopora Saulcy, 1865
 Tribe Feldini Kistner, 1972
 Tribe Gymnusini Heer, 1839
 Gymnusa Gravenhorst, 1806
 Tribe Himalusini Klimaszewski, Pace & Center, 2010
 Tribe Homalotini Heer, 1839
 Subtribe Gyrophaenina Kraatz, 1856
 Agaricochara Kraatz, 1856
 Encephalus Kirby, 1832
 Gyrophaena Mannerheim, 1830
 Subtribe Bolitocharina Thomson, 1859
 Bolitochara Mannerheim, 1830
 Euryusa Erichson, 1837
 Heterota Mulsant & Rey, 1874
 Leptusa Kraatz, 1856
 Phymatura J. Sahlberg, 1876
 Tachyusida Mulsant & Rey, 1872
 Subtribe Silusina Fenyes, 1918
 Silusa Erichson, 1837
 Subtribe Homalotina Heer, 1839
 Anomognathus Solier, 1849
 Homalota Mannerheim, 1830
 Pseudomicrodota Machulka, 1935
 Thecturota Casey, 1893
 Subtribe Rhopalocerina Reitter, 1909
 Clavigera Scriba, 1859
 Cyphea Fauvel, 1863
 Tribe Hoplandriini Casey, 1910
 Tribe Hygronomini Thomson, 1859
 Hygronoma Erichson, 1837
 Tribe Hypocyphtini Laporte de Castelnau, 1835 (= Oligotini Thomson, 1859)
 Anacyptus Horn, 1877
 Cypha Samouelle, 1819
 Holobus Solier, 1849
 Oligota Mannerheim, 1830
 Tribe Lomechusini Fleming, 1821 (= Myrmedoniini Thomson, 1867)
 Drusilla Samouelle, 1819
 Lomechusa Gravenhorst, 1806
 Lomechusoides Tottenham, 1939 (Lomechusoides strumosus)
 Maschwitzia
 Meronera
 Myrmedonota
 Zyras Stephens, 1835
 Tribe Masuriini Cameron, 1939
 Tribe Mesoporini Cameron, 1959
 Tribe Mimanommatini Wasmann, 1912
 Tribe Mimecitini Wasmann, 1917
 Tribe Myllaenini Ganglbauer, 1895
 Myllaena Erichson, 1837
 Tribe Oxypodini Thomson, 1859
 Subtribe Oxypodina Thomson, 1859
 Acrostiba Thomson, 1858
 Amarochara Thomson, 1858
 Calodera Mannerheim, 1830
 Cephalocousya Lohse, 1971
 Chanoma Blackwelder, 1952
 Chilomorpha Krasa, 1914
 Crataraea Thomson, 1858
 Drusilla Blackwelder, 1952
 Dexiogya Thomson, 1858
 Haploglossa Kraatz, 1856
 Hygropora Kraatz, 1856
 Ilyobates Kraatz, 1856
 Ischnoglossa Kraatz, 1856
 Mniusa Mulsant & Rey, 1875
 Ocalea Erichson, 1837
 Ocyusa Kraatz, 1856
 Oxypoda Mannerheim, 1830
 Parocyusa Bernhauer, 1902
 Pentanota Bernhauer, 1905
 Phloeopora Erichson, 1837
 Polylobus
 Poromniusa Ganglbauer, 1895
 Pyroglossa Bernhauer, 1901
 Stichoglossa Fairmaire & Laboulbene, 1856
 Thiasophila Kraatz, 1856 (Thiasophila angulata)
 Subtribe Dinardina Mulsant & Rey, 1873
 Dinarda Samouelle, 1819
 Subtribe Meoticina Seevers, 1978
 Meotica Mulsant & Rey, 1873
 Subtribe Tachyusina Thomson, 1859
 Brachyusa Mulsant & Rey, 1874
 Dasygnypeta Lohse, 1974
 Gnypeta Thomson, 1858
 Ischnopoda Stephens, 1835
 Tribe Oxypodinini Fenyes, 1921
 Tribe Paglini Newton & Thayer, 1992
 Tribe Paradoxenusini Bruch, 1937
 Tribe Pediculotini Ádám, 1987
 Tribe Philotermitini
 Philotermes Kraatz, 1857
 Pseudophilotermes Bernhauer, 1934
 Tribe Phyllodinardini Wasmann, 1916
 Tribe Phytosini Thomson, 1867
 Arena Fauvel, 1862
 Phytosus Curtis, 1838
 Tribe Placusini Mulsant & Rey, 1871
 Placusa Erichson, 1837
 Tribe Pronomaeini Mulsant & Rey, 1873
 Tribe Pseudoperinthini Cameron, 1939
 Tribe Pygostenini Fauvel, 1899
 Tribe Sahlbergiini Kistner, 1993
 Tribe Sceptobiini Seevers, 1978
 Dinardilla Wasmann, 1901
 Sceptobius Sharp, 1883
 Tribe Skatitoxenini Kistner & Pasteels, 1969
 Tribe Termitodiscini Termitodiscus
 Termitogerrus
 Tribe Termitohospitini Coptotermocola
 Neotermitosocius
 Termitobra
 Termitohospes
 Termitosocius
 Termitosodalis
 Tribe Termitonannini Tribe Termitopaediini Coatonipulex Kistner, 1977
 Dioxeuta Sharp, 1899 
 Macrotermophila Kistner, 1973 
 Macrotoxenus Kistner, 1968 
 Paratermitopulex Kistner, 1977
 Physomilitaris Kistner, 1977
 Protermitobia Seevers, 1957 
 Termitolinus Wasmann, 1911 
 Termitonda Seevers, 1957 
 Termitopaedia Wasmann, 1911 
 Termitotecna Wasmann, 1912 
 Termitotropha Wasmann, 1899 
 Termozyras Cameron, 1930 
 Tribe Termitusini Termitana
 Termitoecia
 Termitospectrum
 Termitusa
 Termitusodes 
 Tribe Trichopseniini LeConte & Horn 1883
 Tribe Trilobitideini' Trilobitideus''

Gallery

Bibliography
Ferro, M. L., M. L. Gimmel, K. E. Harms, and C. E. Carlton. 2012a. Comparison of the Coleoptera communities in leaf litter and rotten wood in Great Smoky Mountains National Park, USA. Insecta Mundi 259: 1–58. 
Newton, A. F., Jr., M. K. Thayer, J. S. Ashe, and D. S. Chandler. 2001. 22. Staphylinidae Latreille, 1802. p. 272–418. In: R. H. Arnett, Jr., and M. C. Thomas (eds.). American beetles, Volume 1. CRC Press; Boca Raton, Florida. ix + 443 p.
Ashe, J. S. 2005: Phylogeny of the tachyporine group subfamilies and 'basal' lineages of the Aleocharinae (Coleoptera: Staphylinidae) based on larval and adult characteristics. Systematic entomology, 30: 3–37. doi: 10.1111/j.1365-3113.2004.00258.
Thomas, J. C. 2009: A preliminary molecular investigation of aleocharine phylogeny (Coleoptera: Staphylinidae). Annals of the Entomological Society of America, 102: 189–195. doi: 10.1603/008.102.0201

References

External links
 Aleocharinae at Bugguide.net.

 
Articles containing video clips
Beetles described in 1821
Beetles of North America
Beetle subfamilies
Extant Cenomanian first appearances